Arthur William Trollope Daniel (3 January 1841 – 26 January 1873) was an English all-round sportsman and amateur cricketer who played first-class cricket from 1861 to 1869.

Daniel was born at St Pancras, London, the son of William Thomas Shave Daniel. A barrister at Lincoln's Inn, he had been captain of the Harrow Cricket XI and played for its Football XI while at school there. Going up to Trinity College, Cambridge, he was a founder member of the Cambridge University Athletic Club, running in the hurdles race for the university at its first Inter-Varsity sports match in 1864.

After leaving Cambridge, he was mainly associated with Middlesex, as a right-handed batsman and occasional wicket-keeper. He made 37 known appearances in first-class matches.  He played for several predominantly amateur teams including the Gentlemen in the Gentlemen v Players series.

He died of tuberculosis at his brother-in-law's house on Victoria Road, Clapham  on 26 January 1873, and was buried at West Norwood Cemetery. He is commemorated in one light of a stained glass window at St Mary the Virgin church, Great Wakering, Essex.

References

Further reading
 H S Altham, A History of Cricket, Volume 1 (to 1914), George Allen & Unwin, 1962
 Arthur Haygarth, Scores & Biographies, Volumes 1-11 (1744–1870), Lillywhite, 1862–72
 West Norwood Cemetery's Sportsmen, Friends of West Norwood Cemetery, 1995

External links
 CricketArchive profile
 Stained glass memorial

1841 births
1873 deaths
Alumni of Trinity College, Cambridge
English cricketers
English cricketers of 1826 to 1863
English cricketers of 1864 to 1889
Cambridge University cricketers
Gentlemen cricketers
Middlesex cricketers
Burials at West Norwood Cemetery
Gentlemen of the South cricketers
North v South cricketers
Gentlemen of England cricketers
Gentlemen of Middlesex cricketers
People educated at Harrow School
19th-century deaths from tuberculosis
Tuberculosis deaths in England